Gursharanjot Singh Randhawa (born 30 August 1991) is an Indian singer, songwriter and music composer associated with Punjabi, Bhangra, Indi-pop and Bollywood music. He is known for songs like "Lahore", "Ishare Tere", "Slowly Slowly", and "Tere Te". Guru Randhawa's debut single was "Same Girl" in collaboration with Arjun.

Biography 
Randhawa was born as Gursharanjot Singh Randhawa on 30 August 1991, in Noorpur, Dera Baba Nanak tehsil in Gurdaspur district. He started by doing small shows in Gurdaspur and then began performing in Delhi, at small parties and functions. While staying in Delhi, Randhawa completed his MBA. He was named "Guru" by the rapper Bohemia who would shorten his full name while on stage.

Career

2012–2014: Beginnings 
Randhawa started his music journey in December 2012 with a song named "Same Girl" with Arjun who was the first person to take Randhawa in his own video. However, the song was not so successful for both artists.

At the beginning of 2013, Randhawa released his first single named "Chhad Gayi" on YouTube with the label of Speed Records. His elder brother, Ramneek helped him financially to release this song. Later in 2013, he launched his first album Page One and released three songs from the album. "Dardan Nu", "I Like You" and "Southall" were the respective songs. Randhawa launched many songs but none of them became much popular to take Guru to heights. 2014 was also not special for him. He released the remaining songs from the Page One album but did not get success. The songs were "Khali Bottlan", "My Jugni", "Maa", "Na Na Na Na Na", "Pyaar Wale Test", "Modern Thumka", and "Billo On Fire".

2015–2016: Popular in cultures 
Bohemia, who was a well-wisher of Randhawa, requested T-Series to launch the young artist on their channel. Then they collaborated on the song "Patola". This song gathered more than 368 Million views across YouTube. "Patola" also got the award for best Punjabi Duo. Further, he sang with Ikka Singh in the songs "Outfit" and "Khat". In 2016, Randhawa gave four blockbuster songs. He released "Yaar Mod Do" with Millind Gaba again on the label T-Series in January. The motive of the project was to show true friendship and it did and collected more than 252 million YouTube views. In April, Randhawa dropped the song "Tu Meri Rani" on his own YouTube channel. This song also featured the rapper, Haji Springer. One of his most popular songs, "Suit" was released in 2016. It was Randhawa's second collaboration with Arjun. It currently holds 478 million views on YouTube. In September, he collaborated with Rajat Nagpal and released a song named Fashion on T-Series. The song holds more than 254 million views on YouTube currently.

2017–present 
In 2017, Randhawa released an emotional track named "Taare" chocolate for Juhi in January. The track performed average on YouTube but this song's video was trolled to be a copy of Zayn Malik's song "It's You". Randhawa made his Bollywood singing debut in the Indian movie Hindi Medium. His foot tapping track "Suit" was recreated in the film as "Suit Suit".

He sang in the 2017 Indian Premier League opening ceremony. Later in 2017, his two tracks appeared in Bollywood movies. His old track "Tu Meri Rani" was recreated in the Hindi film Tumhari Sulu and an original track named "Lagdi Hai Thaai" was also released in the movie Simran in collaboration with Jonita Gandhi.

His two most-viewed songs, "High Rated Gabru" and "Lahore", have over 1.1 billion and 1 billionviews on T-Series' official YouTube channel respectively. In 2018 "Lahore" won Track of the Year at the Brit Asia TV Music Awards, where Randhawa also won Best Male Act. His first international collaboration was "Slowly Slowly" featuring Pitbull, released on 19 April 2019. The song's music video received 38million views on YouTube within 24 hours, becoming one of the world's all-time most-viewed music videos in 24 hours.

In 2019, Randhawa turned producer with Punjabi language film Tara Mira starring Ranjit Bawa and Nazia Hussan, directed by Rajiev Dhingra.
In 2020, Guru made his second international collaboration "Surma Surma" with British artist Jay Sean.

In the year 2020, Guru's old track "Lahore" was presented as "Lagdi Lahore Di" in the movie 'Street Dancer 3D' in collaboration with Sachin–Jigar and Tulsi Kumar. During the Corona pandemic, he released a soothing track named 'Satnam Waheguru' with Vee. He was also featured by Pitbull in a music video for the track "Mueve La Cintura" with Tito El' Bambino, which is included in Pitbull's album Libertad 548. This was his second collaboration with Pitbull. Guru Randhawa's popularity rose immensely after his Bollywood Debut in the film Hindi Medium and the release of the pop Ballad Lahore in 2018. Rolling stone India stated that, "If you've missed him on the Charts, you've heard him on the radio".

In 2021 He started with "Mehendi Wale Haath" which was loved very much by his fans after that "Doob Gaye" become very popular that crosses 50 million views in 3 days of release. and on 14 July 2021 in history first time the song "Nain Bengali" from India is the first song to cross 70 million views in 24 hrs and 100 million+ views in 50 hrs. Now the song "Aise Na Chhoro" is trending on YouTube.

Media 
Randhawa was ranked in The Times Most Desirable Men at No. 23 in 2018.

He was also ranked in the Chandigarh Times Most Desirable Men at No. 4 in 2019 and No. 6 in 2020.

Discography

Albums

Singles

Film songs

Recreated songs 
Guru Randhawa's Bollywood debut Suit Suit in the 2017 film Hindi Medium, was a remake of his and Arjun's track.
His song Tu Meri Rani was recreated by him and Rajat Nagpal for the 2017 film Tumhari Sulu as Ban Ja Rani.
His song with Bohemia, Patola, was recreated by him as a wedding song in the 2018 film Blackmail.
His most viewed song High Rated Gabru was recreated by him in the 2018 film Nawabzaade.
His single Outfit was recreated by him and music producer Aditya Dev in the 2019 film Ujda Chaman.
His popular track Lahore was recreated by him, in collaboration with Sachin–Jigar duo in the 2020 film Street Dancer 3D.
 Punjabi MC's song Morni Banke was recreated by Tanishk Bagchi in the voice of Guru and Neha Kakkar in the 2018 film Badhaai Ho.
Jassi Sidhu song "Chandigarh Kare Aashiqui" was recreated by Tanishk Bagchi in the voice of Guru Randhawa and Zarah s khan for 2021 film  Chandigarh Kare Aashiqui

Filmography

References

External links 

 
 

Living people
1991 births
Punjabi-language singers
Bollywood playback singers
Indian folk-pop singers
Bhangra (music) musicians
Singers from Punjab, India
Singers from Delhi